Henri Allard (6 February 1891 – 17 October 1982) was a Belgian racing cyclist. He rode in the 1919 Tour de France.

References

1891 births
1982 deaths
Belgian male cyclists
Place of birth missing